The list of ship commissionings in 1896 includes a chronological list of all ships commissioned in 1896.


See also 

1896
 Ship commissionings